The four-man bobsleigh results at the 1932 Winter Olympics in Lake Placid, New York in the United States.

Medallists

Results

References

External links
1932 bobsleigh four-man results

Bobsleigh at the 1932 Winter Olympics